Onke Sydwell Dubase (born 6 August 1989) is a South African rugby union player, currently playing with the  in domestic Currie Cup rugby. His regular position is flanker.

Career

Youth

Dubase was included in the  team for the 2009 and 2010 Under-21 Provincial Championships.

Border Bulldogs and UFH Blues

Dubase played the whole 2011 Vodacom Cup competition, playing in all eight matches.

Dubase didn't play any provincial rugby in 2012 and 2013, but did participate in the Varsity Shield for Alice-based university side  from 2011 to 2014. He scored three tries in the 2014 Varsity Shield competition as UFH had their best season in the competition by finishing third. His performances earned him a recall to the  side and he started three matches towards the end of the 2014 Vodacom Cup campaign. He was also included in their squad for the 2014 Currie Cup qualification tournament.

At the start of 2016, Dubase was one of six Border Bulldogs players that joined the ' Super Rugby squad for a trial period as they prepared for the 2016 Super Rugby season. However, he returned to Border Bulldogs after he failed to be contracted for the Super Rugby side.

References

1989 births
Living people
Border Bulldogs players
Rugby union flankers
Rugby union players from East London, Eastern Cape
South African rugby union players
Alumni of Hudson Park High School